George Albert Jennings (1872 – September 30, 1918) was an American football coach and physician. He served as the head football coach at his alma mater, Bucknell University, from 1897 to 1898, compiling a record of 7–7–4.

Jennings played football at Bucknell, where he was a member of the Kappa Sigma fraternity. After graduating, he played two seasons with the Duquesne Country and Athletic Club of Pittsburgh. He earned a medical degree from Baltimore Medical College in 1902 and, at the time of his death, served as an athletic director for the Burlington Public Schools in Burlington, New Jersey.

Head coaching record

References

1918 deaths
American physicians
Bucknell Bison football coaches
Bucknell Bison football players
University of Maryland School of Medicine alumni
Duquesne Country and Athletic Club players
People from Chesapeake, Virginia
1872 births